Panda District is a district of Inhambane Province in south-east Mozambique. Its principal town is Panda. The district is located at the northwest of the province and borders with Funhalouro District in the north, Homoine District in the east, Inharrime District in the south, and with Chibuto and Manjacaze Districts of Gaza Province in the west. It has a population of 47.946 as of 2007.

Geography
The Changane River, a left tributary of the Limpopo River, makes the western border of the district and of Inhambane province. The Nhatócue River is the biggest river flowing from west to east through the district.

The climate is tropical arid, with the annual rainfall being .

History
The name of the district is related to the name of the son of a tribal chief Mabuntse Ndindane, recognized as an important figure in resistance against colonization. The name was already used by the Portuguese for the area in the 1860s.

Demographics
As of 2005, 42% of the population of the district was younger than 15 years. 39% did speak Portuguese. The predominant language in the district was Chopi. 64% were analphabetic, mostly women.

Administrative divisions
The district is divided into three postos, Panda, Mawayela, and Urrene, which in total include eight localities.

Economy
About 1% of the households in the district have access to electricity.

Agriculture
In the district, there are 11,000 farms which have on average  of land. The main agricultural products are corn, cassava, cowpea, peanut, sweet potatoes, rice, and cotton.

Transportation
Two of then, Panda to Inhassune and Panda to Mubique, have a status of a national road.

References

Districts in Inhambane Province